Brough is a civil parish in the Eden District, Cumbria, England. It contains 39 buildings that are recorded in the National Heritage List for England. Of these, one is listed at Grade II*, the middle of the three grades, and the others are at Grade II, the lowest grade.  The parish contains the village of Brough, at the junction of the A66 and the A685 roads, and the surrounding countryside.  Most of the listed buildings are shops and houses with associated structures in the village.  The other listed buildings include a church, a memorial in the churchyard, three cross bases, a hotel, a farmhouse, three boundary stones, three mileposts, a clock tower, and a bridge.


Key

Buildings

References

Citations

Sources

Lists of listed buildings in Cumbria